Chen Kung-Liang (born 6 March 1964) is a Taiwanese modern pentathlete. He competed at the 1984 Summer Olympics, finishing in 48th place in the individual event.

References

1964 births
Living people
Taiwanese male modern pentathletes
Olympic modern pentathletes of Taiwan
Modern pentathletes at the 1984 Summer Olympics